The Fireballs, sometimes billed as Jimmy Gilmer and the Fireballs, were an American rock and roll group, particularly popular at the end of the 1950s and in the early 1960s. The original line-up consisted of George Tomsco (lead guitar), Chuck Tharp (vocals), Stan Lark (bass), Eric Budd (drums), and Dan Trammell (rhythm guitar).

The Fireballs were formed in Raton, New Mexico, in 1957 and got their start as an instrumental group featuring the distinctive lead guitar of George Tomsco. They recorded at Norman Petty's studio in Clovis, New Mexico. According to group founders Tomsco and Lark, they took their name after their standing ovation performance of Jerry Lee Lewis's "Great Balls of Fire"  at the Raton High School PTA talent contest in New Mexico, USA. They reached the top 40 with the singles "Torquay" (1959), "Bulldog" (1960), and "Quite a Party" (1961). "Quite a Party" peaked at No. 29 in the UK Singles Chart in August 1961. Tharp, Budd, and Trammell left the group in the early 1960s, but the Fireballs added Doug Roberts on drums, plus Petty Studio singer Jimmy Gilmer (born September 15, 1940, in Chicago and raised in Amarillo, Texas) to the group.

Billed as Jimmy Gilmer and the Fireballs, the group reached No. 1 on the Billboard chart with "Sugar Shack", which remained at that position for five weeks in 1963. The single also reached No. 1 on Billboard's R&B chart for one week in November of that year, but its run on that chart was cut short because Billboard ceased publishing an R&B chart from November 30, 1963, to January 23, 1965. Nonetheless, "Sugar Shack" earned the group a Gold Record Award for "Top Song Of 1963" based on record sales. In the UK, the song peaked at No. 45. Jimmy Gilmer and the Fireballs then had another pop hit in 1964 with a similar-sounding "Daisy Petal Pickin'", which reached No. 15 on the Hot 100.

Besides their own recordings, the Fireballs were studio musicians for dozens of other recording artist projects from 1959 through 1970 at the Norman Petty Studio, including folk singer Carolyn Hester and Arthur Alexander. Norman Petty had been Buddy Holly's main recording producer; after Holly's death, he obtained the rights to Holly's early rehearsal and home demo recordings. From May 1962 until August 1968, Petty had the Fireballs overdub the Holly material, making them the band he never knew he had, though the band had met Holly at Petty's studio in 1958. The overdubs were originally released on four albums of "new" Holly material throughout the 1960s with four of the efforts, released as singles, charting. In 1964, they recorded and released an album (solely under Jimmy Gilmer's name) of a dozen Holly covers called Buddy's Buddy, likely inspired by the posthumous collaborations.

During the run of "Daisy Petal Pickin'" on the charts, the British Invasion began with the first hits by The Beatles. The group had difficulty competing with the influx of British artists and did not reach the Top 40 again until 1967, with "Bottle of Wine", which was written by Tom Paxton. The Fireballs took "Bottle of Wine" to No. 9 on the Hot 100. Although Gilmer was still a member of the group, the band was billed simply as "The Fireballs" on that single. Gilmer pursued artist management under Petty, with the group disbanding in 1969. Drummer Doug Roberts died in 1981.

The Fireballs reunited in 1989 for the Clovis Music Festival, then continued performing with original members George Tomsco, Stan Lark, and Chuck Tharp until 2006, when Tharp died of cancer. Gilmer returned as lead vocalist in 2007. Lark retired from the group in 2016.

Lark (born Stanley Roy Lark on July 27, 1940 in Raton, New Mexico) died on August 4, 2021, at age 81.

Tomsco has continued to release CDs of new material using the Fireballs name and continues to do the occasional show, as a "solo Fireball" and also with Gilmer.

Discography

Singles
Note: B-sides appear on the same album as the A-sides except where indicated

+  = Jimmy Gilmer and the Fireballs++ = Jimmy Gilmer* = A-sides re-recorded for album inclusion

Albums

+ = Jimmy Gilmer and the Fireballs++ = Jimmy Gilmer

References

External links
Official site
[ The Fireballs] at Allmusic.com
[ Jimmy Gilmer] at Allmusic.com
Jimmy Gilmer Interview NAMM Oral History Library (2017)

Rock and roll music groups
Dot Records artists
Top Rank Records artists
Atco Records artists
Rock music groups from New Mexico
People from Raton, New Mexico